Nikephoros Lykaon or Lalakon was a Byzantine protospatharios and strategos of Naissus in ca. 1050. He is known only through his seal.

References

11th-century Byzantine people
Byzantine governors
11th century in Serbia
History of Niš
Byzantine Serbia
Protospatharioi